Lawnview Memorial Park, also referred to as Lawnview Cemetery, is a cemetery located at 500 Huntingdon Pike in Rockledge, Pennsylvania. It is 82 acres in size and is managed by the Odd Fellows Cemetery Company of Philadelphia. It contains the reburial of tens of thousands of bodies from Monument Cemetery and the Odd Fellows Cemetery in Philadelphia after they were closed in the 1950s.

History
In 1904, the cemetery was established in Rockledge, Pennsylvania. In 1914, a stone chapel was built to provide non-denominational services for funerals.

In 1956, Monument Cemetery in Philadelphia was closed and the property sold to Temple University and the Philadelphia Board of Education. The University contacted 748 families about the cemetery closure.  Approximately 28,000 bodies were reinterred to Lawnview Memorial Park with only 300 grave markers included in the move for families members that were located. Most of the reinterrments were placed in a mass grave. The original headstones were not used at the new grave sites.  Most of the remaining headstones were used as riprap during the construction of the Betsy Ross Bridge and can be seen on the shores of the Delaware River at low tide.

In 1951, the Oddfellows Cemetery in Philadelphia was acquired by the Philadelphia Housing Authority for construction of the Raymond Rosen housing project. The bodies were moved to two other cemeteries owned by the Odd Fellows – Mount Peace Cemetery in Philadelphia and Lawnview Memorial Park.

In 1973, the Oddfellows Cemetery Company of Philadelphia  installed a flag pole in Lawnview Memorial Park with a memorial plaque commemorating veterans buried in Lawnview and other current and defunct Oddfellows cemeteries in the Philadelphia region.

In 1979, the chapel was converted to the Odd Fellows Cemetery Company's general offices.

Notable burials

 DeWitt Clinton Baxter (1829–1881), Union Army colonel and brevet brigadier general
 Henry Brutsche (1846–1880), Medal of Honor recipient
 John Hull Campbell (1800–1868), U.S. Congressman
 John E. Clopp (1845–1866), Medal of Honor recipient
 Thomas Birch Florence (1812–1875), U.S. Congressman
 Andy Knox (1864–1940), Major League Baseball first baseman
 James Landy (1813–1875), U.S. Congressman
 George Lippard (1822–1854), novelist, journalist, playwright, social activist and labor organizer
 Henry Dunning Moore (1817–1887), U.S. Congressman
 Charles Frederick Pracht (1880–1950), U.S. Congressman
 Hampton S. Thomas (1837–1899), Medal of Honor recipient
 Harold Charles Wilson (1903–1981), Olympic Bronze Medalist in rowing

Gallery

References

External links 
 
 
 

1904 establishments in Pennsylvania
Cemeteries established in the 1900s
Cemeteries in Montgomery County, Pennsylvania
Mass graves
Odd Fellows cemeteries in the United States